Stoke Church may refer to:

 Stoke Minster
 St Nectan's Church, Hartland
 Other churches in places called Stoke